EVL  may refer to:

 Electronic Visualization Laboratory, at the University of Illinois at Chicago
 Emergency vehicle lighting
 Enah/Vasp-like, a protein
 Enterprise Volleyball League, a Taiwanese volleyball league
 EV Landshut, a German ice hockey league
 E. V. Lucas (1868–1938), English writer